Jon-Allan Edward Butterworth  (born 6 February 1986 in Birmingham) is a British paralympic cyclist. He represented Great Britain at the 2012 & 2016 Summer Paralympics.

Butterworth lost his left arm in 2007 in an insurgent rocket attack when serving as a senior aircraftman weapons technician with the Royal Air Force at Basra airbase in Iraq. He had previously served in Afghanistan in 2005.

Butterworth got into cycling by taking part in the first Help for Heroes bike ride in 2008, from there he went on to be recognized as talented at a ParalympicsGB Talent ID day

At London 2012 he won silver medals in the C4-5 kilo, C5 4km individual Pursuit and mixed team sprint. In the kilo, his C5 world record was beaten by Alfonso Cabello.

At the 2016 Summer Paralympics he finished in 4th place in the C4-5 1k Time trial, and then won Gold with Jody Cundy and Louis Rolfe in the C1-5 750m Team Sprint.

Butterworth was appointed Member of the Order of the British Empire (MBE) in the 2017 New Year Honours for services to cycling.

References

1986 births
Living people
British male cyclists
Paralympic cyclists of Great Britain
Paralympic silver medalists for Great Britain
Cyclists at the 2012 Summer Paralympics
Royal Air Force airmen
Royal Air Force personnel of the War in Afghanistan (2001–2021)
Royal Air Force personnel of the Iraq War
UCI Para-cycling World Champions
Sportspeople from Birmingham, West Midlands
English amputees
Medalists at the 2012 Summer Paralympics
Cyclists at the 2016 Summer Paralympics
Medalists at the 2016 Summer Paralympics
Paralympic gold medalists for Great Britain
Members of the Order of the British Empire
Paralympic medalists in cycling
20th-century British people
21st-century British people
English racing drivers
Britcar drivers